Aechmea kentii is a species of plant in the family Bromeliaceae. It is endemic to Morona-Santiago Province in Ecuador.  Its natural habitats are subtropical or tropical moist lowland forests and subtropical or tropical moist montane forests. It is threatened by habitat loss.

References

kentii
Endangered plants
Plants described in 1991
Endemic flora of Ecuador
Taxonomy articles created by Polbot